Simen Skjønsberg (2 September 1920 – 26 December 1993) was a Norwegian journalist and writer.

He was born in Øyer. During the occupation of Norway by Nazi Germany he was arrested by the Nazi authorities following the 1943 University of Oslo fire. After being initially imprisoned in Stavern he was shipped to German camps, where he was incarcerated in Sennheim and Buchenwald until the liberation. He finally graduated as cand.mag. in 1950. He was hired as a journalist in Dagbladet in 1954, and was its cultural editor from 1959 to 1978. He was succeeded by Hans Fredrik Dahl.

He published several novels, including Der bommene senkes (1971), Fuglebrettet (1973), Gitter i lyset (1975) and Ingen friplass på karusellen (1977). He also wrote poetry, his collections including Vi er blitt fremmede (1965), Dag for reisende (1967), Dikt. Norwegian-German (translated and edited by Hans Däumling, 1969), Flyttedag (1969), I realismesalen (1984) and Grensevakter (1987). He was awarded the Mads Wiel Nygaards Endowment in 1970 and the Gyldendal's Endowment in 1984.

References

1920 births
1993 deaths
People from Øyer
20th-century Norwegian novelists
20th-century Norwegian poets
Buchenwald concentration camp survivors
Dagbladet people
Norwegian male novelists
Norwegian male poets
Sennheim concentration camp survivors
University of Oslo alumni
20th-century Norwegian male writers
20th-century Norwegian journalists